Motobirds were the UK's first all-women motorcycle stunt riding display group.

They were formed in 1972, following a Leicester Mercury ad seeking girls to ride motorcycles. They appeared at shows across Europe and on TV, "often wearing little more than a bikini and a short skirt".

In 2016, six of the original members were reunited on BBC TV's The One Show.

References

British motorsport people
British stunt performers
Motorcycle stunt performers